Jacqueline Diana “Jacky” González Servín (born 2 October 1991) is a Paraguayan footballer who plays as a midfielder. She has been a member of the Paraguay women's national team.

International career
González represented Paraguay at the 2008 FIFA U-17 Women's World Cup. At senior level, she played the 2014 Copa América Femenina.

References

1991 births
Living people
Women's association football midfielders
Paraguayan women's footballers
Paraguay women's international footballers
Cerro Porteño players
20th-century Paraguayan women
21st-century Paraguayan women